Magtymguly Pyragy ( Makhdumqoli Farāghi; ; ; ; , born Magtymguly, was a Turkmen spiritual leader, philosophical poet, Sufi and traveller who is considered to be the most famous figure in Turkmen literary history.

Magtymguly is the greatest representative of Turkmen literature, credited with the creation of Turkmen written literature, and whose literary form became a powerful symbol of the historical and the incipient national consciousness of the Turkmen people. He is part of a unique period in the cultural history of Central Asia, with his exceptional talent projecting his personal poetic synthesis onto the next generation of poets of the region.

In a wider context, Magtymguly is often placed alongside major figures of the Turkic literary world such as Hoja Ahmad Yasawi, Yunus Emre, Ali-Shir Nava'i and Fizuli.

Biography

Early life and education 
Magtymguly was born in Haji Qushan, a village near the city of Gonbad-e Qabus in the modern-day province of Golestan, Iran, the northern steppes of which are known as Turkmen Sahra (Turkmen steppes). It was part of the extensive Safavid Empire in the first half of the 18th century.

Magtymguly's name means "slave of Magtym", where Magtym is one of the sacred lineages among the Turkmen people. However, the poet, along with his name, also used a distinct nom de plume or makhlas in his poems, which was "Feraghi". It comes from Arabic and means "the one separated from" happiness, or union with his beloved.

His father was also a local teacher and mullah, and was highly regarded by his people. 

Magtymguly received his early education in the Turkmen, Persian and Arabic languages from his father. He also learned ancestral trades such as felt-making and, according to some sources, jewellery.

 
Magtymguly provided basic information about himself, his family and children in his poetry. In his poem "" (Known in the world), Magtymguly says: "Tell those who enquire about me that I am a Gerkez, I hail from Etrek and my name is Magtymguly", identifying his homeland as the banks of the Etrek River and expressing his identity through his tribe.

Later life 
Magtymguly traveled extensively during his lifetime, mostly to widen his erudition, with the territories of present-day Azerbaijan, India, Iran and Uzbekistan among the countries known to have been visited by him.

Not much is known about Magtymguly's family life. He was unable to marry a woman he loved from his own village, whom he dedicated a great deal of his love poems. 

I am separated from my flower.
From my black-haired beauty,
From my nice-voiced nightingale,
I am separated from my sweet-talking love.

Magtymguly died in 1782. His resting place is in the village of Aq Taqeh-ye Qadim, in Golestan Province, Iran. Nowadays, his tomb is the site of pilgrimages at which prayers and Sufi "dhikrs" are performed by members of different ethnic groups.

Sufism and mysticism 

A number of Magtymguly's poems display Sufistic philosophical attitudes that stress certain teachings and practices of the Quran and the sunnah, describing ethical and spiritual goals.

Regarded as an initiation rite often seen in Sufism, it is believed that Magtymguly received his poetic talent from the prophet Muhammad in one of his dreams.

A number of Magtymguly's ghazals, however, when taken out of context, seem to make antinomian statements with regard to religion. Despite this, Magtymguly should not be compared to an Uzbek poet Mashrab, who was an antinomian heterodox Sufi and hanged in 1712, nor should he be compared to an Iraqi Turkmen poet Nesimi, who adopted self-deification stance. Antinomian heterodoxy appears not to be the major trend in Magtymguly's poetry. His conventional stand, in fact, is the Sufi station of khajrat (bewilderment). 

The following is an excerpt from Magtymguly's  poem is an exemplary work containing all of the familiar Sufi elements:  

.

     
Makhtumquli is drunk with love of You
His dazzled eye stares in amazement at his Friend
In the nine spheres above the seven earths,
Oh Lord, will I hear from You 

Note: The first four lines is the original (Turkmen) language of the poem written using Arabic alphabet as in one of the earliest manuscripts, while next are in modern Turkmen alphabet; English translation is provided further down.

1

 Feraghi-in-love will state his will,
 Our sacred duty is to pray and fast,

2

 
 We have this debt on our shoulders,
 Let's return it before we leave!

In the poem below, called  (I'd Like to Feel the Wind of Dawn), all three people Magtymguly wishes to have seen (known) are considered prominent figures in Sufism, with Bahauddin being the founder of one of the largest Sufi Sunni orders, the Naqshbandi.

.

     
I'd like to feel the wind of dawn,
On the hills of Dehestan,
I'd like to see Zengi Baba,
Bahauddin, Mirkulal.

Political ideals
Magtymguly lived at a time when Turkmen tribes were displaced from their homeland, and plundered as a result of constant clashes with Iran and Khiva. He deeply resented it and expressed his feelings of repentance in his poems. Indeed, Magtymguly express strong social protest in his poems, but his political thought is mostly directed towards the unification of the Turkmen tribes and the establishment of an independent polity for Turkmens.

Poetry

Magtymguly was one of the first Turkmen poets to introduce the use of classical Chagatai, the court language of the Khans of Central Asia, as a literary language, incorporating many Turkmen linguistic features. His poetry exemplifies a trend towards increased use of Turkic languages rather than Persian; he is revered as the founder of Turkmen poetry, literature and language. Magtymguly's poetry also gave start to an era litterateurs depict as the "Golden age" in Turkmen literature. His literary form became a powerful symbol of the historical and the incipient national consciousness of the Turkmen people.

Unlike his father and another prominent Turkmen poet of the era, Andalib, Magtymguly employed strophic form, usually quatrains (qoshuk) for his poems making them syllabic. Vast majority of his poems are in the form of folk Turkmen songs, qoshuk and aydish, with the latter being a form of musical contest usually involving two poets.

The following is Magtymguly's work -  (of the Turkmen), with the text transliterated into Turkmen (Latin) letters.

Legacy 

Magtymguly is part of a unique period in the cultural history of Central Asia; his exceptional talent projected his personal poetic synthesis onto the next generation of poets of the region.

Magtymguly is often placed alongside major figures of the Turkic literary world such as Hoja Ahmad Yasawi, Yunus Emre, Ali-Shir Nava'i and Fizuli.

27 June is celebrated in Turkmenistan as "the Day of Workers of Culture and Arts and the poetry of Magtymguly Fragi".

Monuments 
Monuments to Magtymguly Pyragy are installed in cities across the former USSR, including Kyiv (Kiev), Astrakhan, Tashkent, and Khiva, as well as in Iran and Turkey. A monument to Magtymguly made of concrete and natural stone was erected in Magtymguly Square on Magtymguly Avenue in the center of Ashgabat in 1971. He is also one of several statues that surround the Independence Monument in Ashgabat. The statues depict people praised in the Ruhnama, a spiritual guide written by Turkmenistan president Saparmurat Niyazov.

Toponyms 
 Magtymguly is a city in far south-western Turkmenistan in Balkan Province, the administrative center of Magtymguly District.
 Magtymguly is a zone in a gas and oil field in Turkmenistan.

Institutions and organizations 

The following are named after Magtymguly:
 Turkmen State University
 Magtymguly National Institute of Language, Literature and Manuscripts
 Magtymguly Musical and Drama Theater in Ashgabat.
 Youth Organization of Turkmenistan
 A library in Kyiv.

Cinema 
 Makhtumkuli (1968, producer Alti Karliyev) — the role was played by Hommat Mulluk.
 Fragi – Razluchyonnyy so schastyem (1984, producer Khodzhakuli Narliev) — the role was played by Annaseid Annamuhammedov.

Postage 

In 1959, the USSR issued a postage stamp to mark the 225th anniversary of the birth of Magtymguly. In 1983, the USSR issued another stamp to mark the 250th anniversary of his birth.
Turkmenistan issued a 10 manat banknote bearing his likeness in 2009.

Other 
 In 1974, an orchestral composition by Veli Mukhatov was created "In memory of Magtymguly".
 In 1992, the Magtymguly International Prize in the field of Turkmen language and literature was established.
 In 2013, the composer Mamed Huseynov wrote an opera called "Monologues of Magtymguly Pyragy".
 From 2002 to 2008, the month of May in Turkmenistan bore the name "Magtymguly".
 In 2014, the Magtymguly Pyragy Medal was established as a reward for great achievements in the study, dissemination and promotion of the creative heritage of Magtymguly.
 A Turkmen dry cargo ship is named "Magtymguly".

See also
History of Turkmenistan
Turkmen literature
Turkmen music
Bagşy
Sufism
Döwletmämmet Azady
Magtymguly International Prize

Notes

References

External links

Essay on Magtymguly's Philosophy of Upbringing
Essay on the life and works of the poet
English translations of his poems

18th-century births
1800s deaths
Turkmenistan Sufis
History of Turkmenistan
Ethnic Turkmen poets
Turkmenistan religious leaders
18th-century Iranian poets
Iranian Turkmen people
Burials in Iran
People from Golestan Province
19th-century Iranian poets